Konrad V von Jungingen (c. 1355 – 30 March 1407) was a grand master of the Teutonic Order from 1393 to 1407. Under his administration, the Teutonic Order would reach its greatest extent.

Konrad von Jungingen came from the Swabian League and joined the Teutonic Order together with his younger brother Ulrich around 1380. At first, he was a commander at the castle in Osterode. In 1391, he was promoted to the Treasurer of Marienburg.

Konrad's election to Grand Master and head of the Order arose through an indirect fashion. As chairman of the order, policy excluded him from consideration. One of the brothers, Wolf von Zolnhart, proposed his candidacy for the post of grand master. His proposal went unopposed, and on 30 November 1393, he was elected unanimously as Grand Master. 

Konrad opted to retain most of the policies of his predecessors. However, unlike them, he chose the path of diplomacy. He interfered with the Lithuanian Civil War between the great princes by once supporting Vytautas and another time Skirgaila. He also intended to weaken Poland–Lithuania and the superior rights of Jogaila to the Grand Duchy of Lithuania.

Thanks to his clever policy, he obtained Samogitia for the Order. In 1402, taking advantage of the financial problems of Sigismund von Luxembourg, he bought the Neumarch. However, territorial acquisitions brought him more problems than benefits. In the Neumarch, the local knights objected to the dictatorial power of the Order, and a peasant uprising, instigated by Jogaila, broke out in Samogitia.

In 1398, King Albert of Sweden pledged the island of Gotland to the Order in an attempt to curtail the predatory attacks of the Victual Brothers on maritime shipping throughout the Baltic Sea. Later that year, Konrad lead a successful invasion force and destroyed Visby. That would bring Konrad into conflict with the newly-formed Kalmar Union under Queen Margaret I of Denmark when the Order refused to relinquish Gotland. 

The threat of war on all sides forced Konrad to seek agreement with one of his rivals. In that situation, he decided to make diplomatic overtures to Krakow. In 1404, he met Ladislaus in the bishopric of Kuyavia in Raciaz. His cessation of Dobrzyn to the Polish Crown guaranteed peace with Poland–Lithuania.

He died after a long illness on 30 March 1407 in Marienburg. He was buried in the mausoleum of the great masters under the chapel of St. Anne. According to the Chronicle of Gdańsk, the dying Grand Master warned the Teutonic dignitaries against choosing his militant brother as a successor and called him a fool.

References 
 Friedrich Borchert: "Die Hochmeister des Deutschen Ordens in Preußen." In: Preußische Allgemeine Zeitung, 6 October 2001.
 C. A. Lückerath: Article K. v. Jungingen in Dictionary of the Middle Ages
 
 Casimir Bumiller, Magdalene Wulfmeier: Konrad und Ulrich von Jungingen, Beiträge zur Biografie der beiden Deutschordenshochmeister, Geiger-Verlag, Horb a. Neckar 1995
 Sebastian Kubon: Die Außenpolitik des Deutschen Ordens unter Hochmeister Konrad von Jungingen (1393–1407) (= Nova mediaevalia. Quellen und Studien zum europäischen Mittelalter. Volume 15). V & R Unipress, Göttingen 2007, .

1355 births
1407 deaths
People from Zollernalbkreis
Grand Masters of the Teutonic Order
German untitled nobility
Gotland
Burials in the Chapel of St. Anne, Malbork
People from Malbork